is a Japanese footballer who is currently playing for Angkor Tiger.

Club

Europe
After graduating from university, he went for trail around Europe and signed for Montenegrin second division side FK Kom Podgorica.

He subsequently join FK Rudar Pljevlja after impressing for FK Kom.

Indonesia
After leaving Europe, he went on trial with Indonesia club,  Madura United in 2019.  He failed to win the contract.

Singapore
He joined Tanjong Pagar United in 2020 and stayed for 3 years.

Career statistics

Club

Notes

References

1993 births
Living people
Japanese footballers
Japanese expatriate footballers
Association football midfielders
Montenegrin Second League players
Montenegrin First League players
Singapore Premier League players
FK Kom players
FK Rudar Pljevlja players
OFK Petrovac players
Tanjong Pagar United FC players
Japanese expatriate sportspeople in Montenegro
Expatriate footballers in Montenegro
Japanese expatriate sportspeople in Singapore
Expatriate footballers in Singapore